"Quelle est cette odeur agréable?" (in English, "Whence is that goodly fragrance flowing?") is a 17th-century traditional French Christmas carol about the Nativity.

The carol was used with words written by John Gay for The Beggar's Opera "Fill ev'ry Glass" in 1728.  Another version for four-part choir and baritone solo was arranged by David Willcocks.

Frank Houghton wrote the hymn "Thou who wast rich beyond all splendour" to the melody of this French carol.

See also
 List of Christmas carols

References

External links
 Quelle est cette odeur agréable? from the Cyber Hymnal

French folk songs
French-language Christmas carols
17th-century hymns